The National Women's Lacrosse League (NWLL) is a National Association of Intercollegiate Athletics (NAIA) women's lacrosse-only college athletic conference. The vast majority of NAIA women's lacrosse programs play at the club level as part of the Women's Collegiate Lacrosse Associates (WCLA).  The NAIA does not currently organize the sport of lacrosse for its member institutions, although there is hope this may change in the near future.  In the meantime, the NWLL is providing an umbrella organization for all women's varsity NAIA lacrosse teams in the USA, including a national championship tournament.

Founding schools of the NWLL were Indiana Institute of Technology, Missouri Baptist University, Reinhardt University, Robert Morris University (Illinois), Shorter University and Tennessee Wesleyan College.  Conference play began during the 2010-11 season, culminating in the first NWLL conference tournament championship won by Indiana Tech on April 22–23, 2011 at Shorter University.

On April 26, 2011 the NWLL announced the addition of three new members for the 2011-12 academic year: Davenport University, Savannah College of Art and Design and Siena Heights University.  On October 12, 2011 it was announced that Midland University would also join in 2011-12.

The Wolverine-Hoosier Athletic Conference (WHAC) announced on January 27, 2012, that it is making history by adding lacrosse for both men and women as conference sports effective the fall of 2012. The WHAC is the first conference in the NAIA to offer lacrosse as a conference championship sport.  At this time, the WHAC schools are still operating under the umbrella of NWLL.

Member schools

League Championship

See also
 NAIA lacrosse

References

External links
NWLL
NWLL Championship

NAIA conferences
Women's lacrosse competitions in the United States
College lacrosse leagues in the United States
College sports in Illinois
College sports in Indiana
College sports in Missouri
College sports in Tennessee
College sports in Georgia (U.S. state)